Bloody Wednesday is a 1988 thriller film directed by Mark G. Gilhuis and starring Raymond Elmendorf, Pamela Baker, and Jeff O'Haco. It is based on the events of the San Ysidro McDonald's massacre.

Premise
Harry is an auto mechanic going through a nasty divorce. When he gets fired from his job, he begins to lose his mind and walks into a church nude. Harry is subsequently committed to a mental hospital. After his release, he decides to stay in an abandoned hotel, where he begins having hallucinations. As his life degenerates, Harry begins to plan a shooting massacre at a local fast food restaurant.

Cast
 Raymond Elmendorf as Harry
 Pamela Baker as Dr. Johnson
 Navarre Perry	as Ben Curtis
 Teresa Mae Allen as Elaine Curtis
 Jeff O'Haco as Animal
 Linda Dona as Pretty Lady
 Herb Kronsberg as Walter Burns
 Murray Cruchley as Lou Cramer

Release
Bloody Wednesday was shot in 1985 but released on September 8, 1988, on VHS.  On April 19, 2016, the film was finally officially released on DVD in the United States by Film Chest. A Blu-ray release has yet to be announced.

The movie gained poor critical reception and is nowadays known as b-movie cult classic.

Differences between the real massacre and the movie
The name of the killer is Harry instead of the real James Huberty and Harry uses a revolver instead of a Browning HP used by Huberty. The Uzi used in the film was fully automatic while Huberty's Uzi was semi-automatic.

James Huberty was taken down and killed by a police SWAT sniper, while Harry is fatally shot down by a restaurant customer.

The real-life massacre took place at a McDonald's restaurant, while the massacre in the movie takes place at a nameless cafe.

The actual massacre lasted for 77 minutes, while the massacre in the movie lasts for the final five minutes.

Five children (under age 18) were killed in the actual massacre, while no children are seen in the movie.

References

External links

 
 

1988 films
1988 horror films
1980s crime thriller films
American crime drama films
American horror drama films
American crime thriller films
American horror thriller films
Crime horror films
American independent films
Crime films based on actual events
Horror films based on actual events
Films set in San Diego
1980s English-language films
1980s American films